Qeshlaq-e Hajj Aqaqoli (also Romanized as Qeshlāq-e Ḩājj Āqāqolī) is a village in Aslan Duz Rural District, Aslan Duz District, Parsabad County, Ardabil Province, Iran. At the 2006 census, its population was 156, in 32 families.

References 

Towns and villages in Parsabad County